Dmitri Vishnevsky (born January 3, 1990) is a Russian professional ice hockey defenceman who currently plays for HC Spartak Moscow of the Kontinental Hockey League (KHL).

References

External links

1990 births
Living people
Russian ice hockey defencemen
HC Dynamo Moscow players
HC Spartak Moscow players
People from Moscow Oblast
Sportspeople from Moscow Oblast